Steve Johnson was the defending champion but did not participate.

Tim Smyczek won the title when Rajeev Ram retired in the final.

Seeds

Draw

Finals

Top half

Bottom half

References
 Main Draw
 Qualifying Draw

RBC Tennis Championships of Dallas - Singles
2015 Singles